Varangéville is a commune in the Meurthe-et-Moselle département in north-eastern France.

Inhabitants of Varangéville are known as Varangévillois(e)s.

See also
 Communes of the Meurthe-et-Moselle department

References

Communes of Meurthe-et-Moselle